En Pondatti Nallava is a 1995 Tamil language drama film directed by Senthilnathan. The film stars Napoleon and Khushbu, with Senthil, Vadivelu, Janagaraj, Y. G. Mahendra, Kovai Sarala, Sathyapriya and Jayamala playing supporting roles. It was released on 14 April 1995.

Plot 

Radhika is an honest government employee and she is in charge of the food ration shop. She is then transferred to a remote village. In the village, everything goes well until the release from jail of the dreaded Rajappa who spent 5 years in jail. Rajappa is known to be a dangerous man who sold illicit arrack and raped the village girls. Half of the villagers flee the village and they settle down in the nearby village. The village police Inspector wants to send Rajappa back in jail.

Upon his arrival at the village, Rajappa rapes the poor Radhika. Much to his surprise, Radhika challenges him to change him as a good man. Later, Radhika becomes pregnant and gives birth to a baby girl. When Radhika names her daughter as Sivagami, Rajappa turns berserk (Sivagami was his mother's name). Radhika tells him his past and his mother's past.

When Rajappa was a school student, he was brainwashed by the illicit arrack seller Uthamarasa and he began to sell his illicit products. His mother Sivagami and his sister left him and started a new life in Sivakasi, his sister got married and had a girl : Radhika. Many years later, Rajappa's mother Sivagami and his niece Radhika came to see Rajappa during the village festival. His mother strongly believed that he had changed and became a good man. But Rajappa became a womanizer and a dreaded arrack seller. At the festival, he got into a fight with the local arrack merchants and killed them all. After seeing this, Sivagami died of heart attack in Radhika's hands. That day, Radhika decided to change Rajappa as a good man.

What transpires next forms the rest of the story.

Cast 

Napoleon as Rajappa
Khushbu as Radhika
Senthil
Vadivelu
Janagaraj
Y. G. Mahendra
Kovai Sarala as Thulasi
Sathyapriya as Sivagami
Jayamala as Mayilu
Arathi as Kuyilu
Ajay Rathnam as Inspector
K. S. Jayalakshmi
Raviraj as Uthamarasa
Mahanadi Shankar as Thulukanam
Ashokan
Shanmugasundaram as Ponnusamy
King Kong
Typist Gopu
Vellai Subbaiah
Kullamani
Karuppu Subbiah
Thideer Kannaiah
Mahendran

Soundtrack 
The film score and the soundtrack were composed by Deva, with lyrics written by Pulamaipithan and Muthulingam.

Reception
Thulasi of Kalki wrote one of the immortal subjects of Tamil cinema is Mangamma Sabatham. By mixing action, sentiments and other things together, you get En Pondatti Nallava. But it makes us sit at the edge of the seat with amazing screenplay.

References 

1990s Tamil-language films
1995 drama films
1995 films
Films directed by Senthilnathan
Films scored by Deva (composer)
Indian drama films